Inheritance law in Canada is constitutionally a provincial matter.  Therefore, the laws governing inheritance in Canada is legislated by each individual province.

Provincial and territorial estate laws

Ontario
Inheritance law in Ontario is governed by the Succession Law Reform Act (SLRA). The SLRA sets out the rules for how property is distributed when someone dies without a will (intestate) and how to probate a will. 

The Act provides for certain family members to be entitled to a portion of the deceased's estate, including spouse, children and parents. The Act also includes provisions for the distribution of property in certain situations, such as when a person dies without a will and has no living relatives.

Wills
 
In order to have a valid will in Ontario, it must meet the following requirements:
 The will must be in writing and signed by the testator (the person making the will)
 The testator must be of legal age (18 years old) and have mental capacity to make a will
 The will must be signed in the presence of two witnesses who must also sign the will in the presence of the testator and each other. The witnesses cannot be beneficiaries of the will.
 If the will is not a holographic will, it must also be attested to by an affidavit of execution before it can be submitted for probate.
 The executors of the will can be beneficiaries, but the witnesses cannot.

It also allows for the creation of holographic will, which is a will written entirely in the testator's handwriting and signed by the testator; no witnesses or formalities are required.Accordingly, there can be no affidavit of execution. As part of the probate application, when being challenged, the executor may instead be asked to provide the Court with evidence that the signature and the handwriting on the Will are those of the deceased.

Probate 

The process of probate in Ontario is a legal process where a court approves the validity of a will and grants authority to the executor named in the will to distribute the deceased person's assets according to the instructions in the will. The process  involves  several steps.

Intestate Succession 

Where a person dies intestate, the following general rules apply:
 Where the spouse survives, all the estate goes to the spouse.
 Where there is a spouse and a child or children, the estate is divided as follows:
First however a matrimonial home will generally pass directly to the spouse.

 Where there is no surviving spouse but there are surviving children, the estate is divided equally among the children.
 Where there is no surviving spouse or children, the estate devolves according to the rules of consanguinity.
 Where no heir can be determined, the estate is declared bona vacantia and escheats to the Crown.

See also 
 Estate planning
 Will and testament
 Ethical will
 Holographic will
 Will Aid
 Will contest
 Power of attorney
 Segregated_fund#Probate_protection

References

Law of Canada
Inheritance law by country